Le Château Apartments is an apartment building in Montreal, Quebec, Canada. It is located at 1321 Sherbrooke Street West in the Golden Square Mile neighbourhood of Downtown Montreal.

The building was commissioned by Pamphile Réal Du Tremblay the owner of La Presse newspaper at the time. It was constructed between February 1925 and 1926, and was designed by Montreal architecture firm Ross and Macdonald. Its facade is Tyndall limestone from Manitoba and its structural material is steel. It ranges from 12 to 14 stories tall. There are 136 apartments.

The building is home to many famous residents, including at one time author Mordecai Richler for more than 20 years.

Architecture
Le Château Apartments were designed to resemble both French châteaux and Scottish fortified houses. The roof of the building is copper, which is commonly found in Canada's grand railway hotels. The facade of the building is mostly Tyndall limestone from Garson, Manitoba, and contains fossils dating from before the last ice age when much of southern Manitoba was covered by a vast sea.  Most of the architectural details are in Indiana Limestone.

References

External links
Le Château Apartments

Apartment buildings in Quebec
Residential buildings in Montreal
Châteauesque architecture in Canada
Downtown Montreal
Limestone buildings
Residential buildings completed in 1926
Ross and Macdonald buildings
Scottish baronial architecture in Canada